() is a dark, sub-kilometer near-Earth object and potentially hazardous asteroid of the Aten group that flew by Earth on 6 June 2020. It was discovered by LINEAR at the Lincoln Laboratory's Experimental Test Site in New Mexico on 9 July 2002.

Orbit  

 flew by Earth on 6 June 2020, passing  from Earth. The asteroid had been recovered two days earlier on 4 June 2020. By 11 June 2020, the asteroid had brightened to apparent magnitude 14.4, which is roughly the brightness of Pluto.

Being a member of the Aten asteroids,  orbits the Sun at a distance of 0.50–1.26 AU once every 10 months (300 days; semi-major axis of 0.88 AU). Its orbit has an eccentricity of 0.43 and an inclination of 5° with respect to the ecliptic. It was first observed by the Near-Earth Asteroid Tracking on Palomar Observatory on 2 July 2002, or seven nights prior to its official discovery observation by LINEAR.

Physical characteristics 

A spectroscopic survey of the small near-Earth asteroid population conducted by European astronomers determined that  is an X-type asteroid. Because of the objects low albedo (see below), it would be considered a primitive P-type asteroid in the Tholen classification.

Diameter and albedo 

(The NEOWISE publication uses the designation G3348 for this asteroid.) In 2016, astronomers using the European New Technology Telescope at La Silla Observatory found a diameter of 613 meters with an albedo of 0.047.

Rotation period 

Lightcurve analysis gave a rotation period of  hours with a high brightness variation of  magnitude, indicative of a highly elongated shape.

Notes

References

External links 
 Stadium-size asteroid will safely fly by Earth tonight, Space.com
 Small Asteroid to Safely Fly by Earth, NASA
 Asteroid 163348, Small Body Data Ferret 
 Discovery Circumstances: Numbered Minor Planets (160001)-(165000) – Minor Planet Center
 
 

163348
163348
163348
20200606
19980724